Peter Verveer Tishler, M.D. (July 18, 1937 – January 18, 2021) is a researcher in human genetics and orphan diseases, educator, and clinician especially in the areas of genetic diseases, including polycystic kidney disease, chronic obstructive pulmonary disease, Fabry disease, and the porphyrias.

Biography
Tishler was born on July 18, 1937  in Boston, Massachusetts to Max Tishler and Elizabeth M. Verveer, and grew up in New Jersey.  He passed away January 18, 2021 in Watertown, New York.

Tishler attended public schools and Harvard College where he majored in biochemistry.  He wrote his senior thesis on carboxypeptidase, in the lab of Dr. C.J. Fu at the Jimmy Fund, graduating cum laude in 1959.

Tishler attended Yale School of Medicine and graduated in 1962.  While at Yale, Tishler began working with the Thorndike Memorial Laboratory at Boston City Hospital from 1963 to 1977.

William B. Castle, discoverer of intrinsic factor, introduced him to Sidney H. Ingbar with whom Tishler began work on the metabolic actions of thyroid hormone.   Maxwell Finland contributed to Tishler’s scientific and clinical work.   Tishler’s interest in genetics arose from his laboratory research in the study of thyroid function in patients with phenylketonuria.

During the Vietnam War, Tishler worked as a Public Health Service officer at the National Institutes of Health. In the following years, he continued his basic laboratory work, but also was concerned with genetics and medicine in the terms of population and epidemiology. He was also involved in familial studies of hypertension at one of the first community health centers in the U.S., East Boston Neighborhood Health Center.

Selected publications

References

External links
Peter Verveer Tishler at Harvard University
Peter Verveer Tishler at the American Porphyria Foundation

1937 births
2021 deaths
American epidemiologists
American geneticists
Medical educators
Harvard University alumni
American medical historians
21st-century American historians
21st-century American male writers
American male non-fiction writers
Writers from Boston